The Rolls-Royce Phantom VI is a British limousine made from 1968 to 1990 by Rolls-Royce. A total of 374 Phantom VIs were made, of which fewer than 40 were manufactured in the last decade of production.

The exterior is almost identical to the facelifted Phantom V.

Construction

Most of the coachwork was created by Mulliner Park Ward, usually in limousine form, although a few landaulets were made.

The Phantom VI was the last Rolls-Royce with a separate chassis. It featured coil springs in front, leaf springs and live axle in rear, and drum brakes on all four wheels.

In 1990, the last Rolls-Royce Phantom VI chassis were built. However, as the completion of the coachwork by Mulliner Park Ward took around 18 months, the last cars were made in the period of the next two years. 

Design of a Phantom VII based on the Silver Shadow's body was discussed in the 1970s, but plans were scrapped. No prototypes were built. A production Rolls-Royce Phantom VII was rolled out in 2003.

Notable owners
Before her death in 2022, Queen Elizabeth II had two Rolls-Royce Phantom VI automobiles – the 1977 Silver Jubilee Car and a more conventional 1986 model. These vehicles were the two main official state cars until the introduction of the two Bentley State Limousines in 2002.

When in use by Queen Elizabeth II, the standard Spirit of Ecstasy hood ornament was replaced by a model of Saint George slaying the dragon. 

Nataša Pirc Musar, President of Slovenia, also owns a Phantom VI; it was previously owned by Princess Alexandra, The Honourable Lady Ogilvy.

Legacy

Three other Phantom models were built between 1995 and 1997, also by order of the Sultan of Brunei. This car was named Rolls-Royce Cloudesque and sometimes referred to as Rolls-Royce Phantom VII. The exterior is reminiscent of a stretched Phantom V Limousine; the extra length being added at the B-pillar. The boot is redesigned, looking more like that of a Silver Seraph. The headlights were designed in a Silver Cloud III style (but with chromed eyelids), hence the name Cloudesque.

References

External links

Rolls-Royce Phantom VI

Rolls-Royce Phantom
Cars introduced in 1968
1970s cars
1980s cars
1990s cars